Ormetica valera is a moth of the family Erebidae. It was described by William Schaus in 1933. It is found in Venezuela.

References

Ormetica
Moths described in 1933